is a railway station in Aoba-ku, Sendai in Miyagi Prefecture, Japan, operated by East Japan Railway Company (JR East).

Lines

Station layout
The station has two opposed side platforms connected to the station building by a footbridge. The station has a Midori no Madoguchi staffed ticket office.

Platforms

History
Rikuzen-Ochiai Station opened on 29 September 1929. The station was absorbed into the JR East network upon the privatization of Japanese National Railways (JNR) on 1 April 1987. A new station building was completed in March 2005.

Passenger statistics
In fiscal 2018, the station was used by an average of 3895 passengers daily (boarding passengers only).

Surrounding area
The station has two entrances. The north entrances leads to a housing complex and further residential areas. The south entrance adjoins National Route 457, which runs from Sendai to Yamagata.

See also
 List of railway stations in Japan

References

External links

 

Stations of East Japan Railway Company
Railway stations in Sendai
Senzan Line
Railway stations in Japan opened in 1929